Santa Lucia is a Roman Catholic church in the town of Gallicano, region of Tuscany, Italy.

The church is documented in the 12th century as being under the control of the Abbey of Frassinoro. It was located near the castle and close to the ancient parish church of Santi Giovanni e Cassiano. An earthquake in 1721 compelled reconstruction. The interior has a 16th-century wooden icon of St Lucy.

References

Churches in Gallicano
12th-century Roman Catholic church buildings in Italy
18th-century Roman Catholic church buildings in Italy